Oru Kal Oru Kannadi abbreviated as OKOK is a 2012 Indian Tamil-language romantic comedy film written and directed by M. Rajesh. It stars producer Udhayanidhi Stalin, in his acting debut, Hansika Motwani, Santhanam and Saranya Ponvannan, whilst featuring Harris Jayaraj's music and Balasubramaniem's cinematography. The film was named after the song of the same name from the film Siva Manasula Sakthi (2009). Releasing on 13 April 2012, it opened to highly positive reviews and became a blockbuster.  The film ran for 175 days in theatres. It was eventually released in Telugu as OK OK on 31 August 2012.

Plot 
One morning in his house, Saravanan receives his ex-girlfriend Meera's wedding invitation. He and his friend Parthasarathy aka Partha leave for Pondicherry to attend the wedding via car. En route, Saravanan recollects his past: He was a easy-going youth working in a film theatre with Partha. He lives with his parents; his father, Varadharajan, who is educated and works as a college professor and his mother, Shenbagam, who is uneducated and is trying to pass an exam, just to get her college degree and her husband's love, since Varadharajan had stopped talking with her the day after their marriage when he found out that Shenbagam is uneducated. One day in traffic, he sees Meera, a girl training to be an air hostess and falls for her on site. He stalks her to a cloth shop and also to her Air Hostess class. He saw her house and he and Partha go to her house, as Meera calls them. There, Meera threatens Saravanan by showing her father's photo, who is a Deputy Commissioner of Police (DCP), Mahendra Kumar. But still, Saravanan stalks her and asks her to love him. Meera takes him to Mahendra Kumar's office and he asks Saravanan to stop following Meera. Meera tells Saravanan that she has some qualifications required by her lover like shaving regularly, dressing well, breaking his friendship with Partha, coming on time, etc.  Saravanan tells this to Partha and Partha asks him if he or Meera is best for him. Saravanan tells him Meera is more important to him than Partha, causing a break between Saravanan's and Partha's friendship.

Later, Saravanan joins Partha's broken love and asks him to rejoin his love. Partha agrees and then they go to Mumbai, following Meera in a flight. There, Meera alas tells him that she loves Saravanan. Meanwhile, Varadharajan later realizes his mistake of mistreating Shenbagam and reconciles with her after Saravanan scoffs him for his behaviour when she turns up late at night which had worried him. After some months, Meera calls Saravanan once, but he does not pick up the phone and tells Partha that Meera is not his real love and it is all nothing, but a "project". But, he really said that for fun. But, Partha had accidentally switched on the phone while Saravanan told him all this. Meera, mistaking him for intentionally misusing her, comes there and breaks their love. At the present, Saravanan's parents arrange to betroth him and Meera by going to the temple, while in Pondicherry, both Saravanan and Partha end up drunk (Saravanan truly drinks for the first time, shocking Partha since Saravanan often inebriated earlier by just sniffing the booze bottle as a running gag in the film) and tell a small story to the guests, in a comical way describing the broken love of Saravanan and Meera. The guests empathize with them and just as the marriage is about to happen, Rajini Murugan, a local don, comes there with a pregnant girl and his girlfriend and reveals that Meera's groom has a girlfriend, who is pregnant by him and that the girl Rajini Murugan is with, is that girl. The groom admits to his mistake and reunites with his old girlfriend. Saravanan and Partha walk off the marriage hall, just then Meera comes and hugs Saravanan, hence reuniting with him.

Cast

Production

Development 
Udhayanidhi Stalin had bought the distribution rights of Rajesh's previous film Boss Engira Bhaskaran. As the film emerged successful, Udhayanidhi decided to continue the collaboration, going on to play the lead role in the new project.

During the pre-production stage, several actresses including Asin Thottumkal and Nayantara were approached to play the female lead but Hansika Motwani was eventually signed. The protagonist was revealed to be an unemployed youngster, as unofficial reports of a ticket collector and a band master were brushed aside. Arya, Sneha and Andrea Jeremiah were roped in to perform cameo roles. Rajesh planned to retain the same crew members from his first two ventures but since Udhayanidhi wanted Harris Jayaraj to score the music for his debut film, he was signed over Rajesh's usual associate Yuvan Shankar Raja, while the makers decided to proceed with Balasubramaniam as the cinematographer as Sakthi Saravanan was unavailable.

Filming 
A photo shoot for the film was held in February 2011 with the lead. The shooting of the film began in March 2011. Filming was held in Tidel Park and Rajiv Gandhi Road in Chennai on 26 April. The car in which they drive to pondicherry was modified with power steering and other interesting elements. A pondicherry bar was setup in woodlands hotel campus.  In the song Azhage, which was totally shot in dubai, in between bgms were recreated in VGP beach and matched by art director Jacki. Overseas shooting locations included Jordan and Abu Dhabi, where the film's team flew over to shoot a song in December 2011. Some shots were canned at the PVR theater in Ampa Mall, Aminjikarai. Hansika Motwani and Saranya were spotted doing a scene together in the theater. In the second schedule, director Rajesh shot a scene on Udayanidhi Stalin, Azhagam Perumal and Saranya Ponvannan at KK Nagar. During a schedule, Santhanam was hospitalized due to illness, delaying the shoot.

Release 
The satellite rights of the film were sold to Sun TV. Oru Kal Oru Kannadi was released on 13 April 2012 in Tamil as a Tamil New Year release and on 31 August 2012 in Telugu.

Soundtrack 

The album features five songs, composed by Harris Jayaraj. The composing sessions took place in Singapore, Zimbabwe and Ooty. The audio launch was held at the Sathyam Cinemas on 4 March 2012. Actors Karthi, Surya, Jeeva and Arya were present at the event. A three-minute trailer and song sequences was screened for the guests and media people as well.

The soundtrack received generally positive reviews. Behindwoods.com claimed that it "definitely has a few like-able singalongs to keep the audio outlets happy", providing a rating of 3/5. The Song Venam Machan Venam became an Instant hit and topped the chart for several weeks. Indiaglitz.com mentioned that the composer had "fulfilled the director's expectations, as the songs strike a chord during the first-listen itself. 'Oru Kal Oru Kannadi' music album celebrates love and reflects youngsters, like the previous films of Rajesh."

Reception

Critical reception 
Oru Kal Oru Kannadi received positive reviews and became a blockbuster at the box office. Sify called it a "rollicking comedy", stating: "If all you're looking for is a relaxed time at the movies, then, this is Good Fun. Go with your buddies, you'll laugh till you have tears in your eyes". The Times of India rated it 3.5 out of 5 and said: "M Rajesh is a rarity in Tamil cinema. How else does one explain sitting through almost a three-hour-long movie without realising the passage of time?" IndiaGlitz said "Oru Kal Oru Kannadi – Humour at Its Best!" and wrote that it was a "clean and convincing film that makes you laugh every minute". Behindwoods.com rated the film 3 out of 5, stating: "OKOK double OK". Oneindia stated that the film "may not have a great storyline, but watching the film is worth every penny". Rohit Ramachandran of Nowrunning.com stated that it was "by no means a meaningful film experience, but it is a portal for popcorn escapism". Pavithra Srinivasan from Rediff.com rated it 2 out of 5 and said: "OKOK is a slightly torturous friendship story of two guys and that's pretty much it".

Box office 
Oru Kal Oru Kannadi opened in more than 300 screens, with an average of 95 per cent theatre occupancy in urban regions. The film began to collect even larger sums of revenue in the next four continuous weeks, acquiring a total of  15.09 crore in a matter of 25 days in Chennai. The film claimed top spot for more than a month at the Chennai box office. Trade pundits declared the film's collections as impressive. Taken with a budget of  13 crore it grossed around  42 crore worldwide.

References

External links 
 

2010s Tamil-language films
2012 films
2012 romantic comedy films
Films about stalking
Films directed by M. Rajesh
Films scored by Harris Jayaraj
Films shot in Abu Dhabi
Films shot in Chennai
Films shot in Dubai
Films shot in Jordan
Films shot in Puducherry
Films shot in the United Arab Emirates
Indian nonlinear narrative films
Indian romantic comedy films